Living Marxism was a British magazine originally launched in 1988 as the journal of the Revolutionary Communist Party (RCP). Rebranded as LM in 1992, it ceased publication in March 2000 following a successful libel lawsuit brought by ITN. It was promptly resurrected as Spiked, an Internet magazine.

History
It was published by Junius Publications Ltd until 1997, and then by Informinc Ltd. Its editor, Mick Hume, an American Studies graduate from Manchester University then aged 29, said: "Our readers are young, angry, thinking people." At its peak in the 1990s, it had a circulation of between 10,000 and 15,000.

Aims 
Living Marxism'''s introduction summarised its outlook as follows: 

 Views 
Views expounded with regularity in LM included "fear culture", for example by questioning the then media coverage of AIDS as a predominantly homosexual disease in the West. Its critique covered media coverage in Africa and the developing world in the context of Western intervention, underdevelopment and poverty. It debated environmentalist claims that limiting consumption was a progressive view.LM writers criticized the media portrayal of the civil wars in Rwanda and Bosnia and disputed that either Serb or Hutu forces committed genocide during those conflicts. In 1993, LM published an exhibition titled "Genocide against the Serbs" which juxtaposed images of Serbs killed in World War II-era crimes with Serbian soldiers killed in battle during the Yugoslav Wars. In 1995, LM published an article by Fiona Fox arguing that:Chris McGreal, "Genocide? What genocide?", The Guardian, 20 March 2000

Historian Marko Attila Hoare characterized their position as genocide denial in relation to both the Rwandan and Bosnian genocides.

It has been suggested by environmentalists such as George Monbiot and Peter Melchett that the group of writers associated with LM continue to constitute an LM network pursuing an ideologically motivated anti-environmentalist agenda under the guise of promoting humanism.Profiles: Martin Durkin, LobbyWatch. Retrieved 17 April 2007. Writers who used to write for Living Marxism reject this as a "McCarthyite conspiracy theory".

 ITN vs. LM 

In February 1997, editor Mick Hume published an article by German journalist Thomas Deichmann which claimed that ITN had misrepresented the Bosnian war in its coverage in 1992. The publishers of LM, Informinc (LM) Ltd., were  sued for libel by ITN. The case initially caused international condemnation of ITN as one of LMs  critics, the journalist George Monbiot, who wrote in Prospect magazine: 

However, Monbiot continued: 

The article "The picture that fooled the world" argued that ITN's footage in which an emaciated Bosnian Muslim man stood behind a barbed wire fence was designed to portray a Nazi-style extermination camp while Deichmann claimed: "It was not a prison, and certainly not a 'concentration camp', but a collection centre for refugees, many of whom went there seeking safety and could leave again if they wished". However, an examination of the substance of this case by a professor of cultural and political geography at Durham University argues that the key claims made by Deichmann and LM are "erroneous and flawed".

The libel case went against LM and in March 2000 the magazine was forced to close. Reporters Penny Marshall and Ian Williams were each awarded £150,000 over the LM story and the magazine was ordered to pay £75,000 for libelling ITN in a February 1997 article.

Looking back Hume commented in The Times: 

In contrast, Professor Campbell of Durham University summarised his study of the case as follows: [A]s strange as existing British libel law is, it had an important and surprisingly beneficial effect in the case of ITN vs LM. The LM defendants and Thomas Deichmann were properly represented at the trial and were able to lay out all the details of their claim that the ITN reporters had "deliberately misrepresented" the situation at Trnopolje. Having charged 'deliberate misrepresentation', they needed to prove 'deliberate misrepresentation'. To this end, the LM defendants were able to cross-examine Penny Marshall and Ian Williams, as well as every member of the ITN crews who were at the camps, along with other witnesses. (That they didn't take up the opportunity to cross-examine the Bosnian doctor imprisoned at Trnopolje, who featured in the ITN stories and was called to testify on the conditions he and others suffered, was perhaps the moment any remaining shred of credibility for LM's allegations evaporated). They were able to show the ITN reports to the court, including the rushes from which the final TV stories were edited, and conduct a forensic examination of the visuals they alleged were deceitful. And all of this took place in front of a jury of twelve citizens who they needed to convince about the truthfulness of their allegations.

They failed. The jury found unanimously against LM and awarded the maximum possible damages. So it was not ITN that bankrupted LM. It was LM's lies about the ITN reports that bankrupted themselves, morally and financially. Despite their failure, those who lied about the ITN reports have had no trouble obtaining regular access to the mainstream media in Britain, where they continue to make their case as though the 2000 court verdict simply didn't exist. Their freedom of speech has thus not been permanently infringed.

 See also 
 Claire Fox
 Fiona Fox
 Frank Furedi
 Munira Mirza
 Graham Barnfield
 James Heartfield
 Science Media Centre
 Sense about Science
 Social Issues Research Centre
 Spiked References 

 Further reading 
 General
 Atrocity, memory, photography: imaging the concentration camps of Bosnia – the case of ITN versus Living Marxism, 
 Archive.org archive of LM Magazine website

 Press articles
 George Monbiot, "The Revolution Has Been Televised", The Guardian, 18 December 1997.
 Matthew Price, "Raving Marxism", Lingua Franca, March 1999.
 Andy Beckett, "Licence to rile", The Guardian, 15 May 1999.
 The Guardian, "Living Marxism and the Serbs", 17 March 2000
 Chris McGreal, "Genocide? What genocide?", The Guardian, 20 March 2000
 Eddie Ford, "Farewell, Living Marxism", Weekly Worker 344, 13 July 2000
 David Pallister, John Vidal and Kevin Maguire, "Life after Living Marxism: Fighting for freedom – to offend, outrage and question everything", The Guardian, 8 July 2000
 David Pallister, John Vidal and Kevin Maguire, "Life after Living Marxism: Banning the bans", The Guardian, 8 July 2000.
 George Monbiot, "Invasion of the Entryists", The Guardian, 9 December 2003
 Chris Bunting, "What's a nice Trot doing in a place like this", Times Higher Education Supplement, 28 January 2005. Mirrored "here".

 Libel action
 Thomas Deichmann, "The picture that fooled the world", LM Magazine issue 97, February 1997
 LM Magazine, Press release to accompany Deichmann article, 25 January 1997
 Ed Vulliamy, "I stand by my story", The Guardian, 2 February 1997
 LM Magazine, "Press statement: ITN tries to gag LM", 21:00 24 January 1997
 "Atrocity, memory, photography: imaging the concentration camps of Bosnia – the case of ITN versus Living Marxism" 
 Julia Hartley-Brewer, "ITN reporter 'bent over backwards for accuracy'", The Guardian, 1 March 2000
 Ed Vulliamy, "Poison in the well of history", The Guardian, 15 March 2000
 John McVicar, "The Scoop that Folded a Magazine", Punch'', #106, May 2000

1988 establishments in the United Kingdom
2000 disestablishments in the United Kingdom
Defunct political magazines published in the United Kingdom
Communist magazines
Magazines established in 1988
Magazines disestablished in 2000
Marxist magazines
Revolutionary Communist Party (UK, 1978)
Deniers of the Bosnian genocide